Hendrella caloptera is a species of tephritid or fruit flies in the genus Hendrella of the family Tephritidae.

Distribution
Kazakhstan, Siberia, Turkmenistan, Mongolia & China.

References

Tephritinae
Insects described in 1850
Diptera of Asia